The Toyora Group is one of the Mesozoic strata in Japan, and was originally named Toyoura Series (or Formation) by Hisakatsu Yabe in 1920. The present name was defined by Tatsuro Matsumoto in 1949.

It is the Lower-Upper Jurassic sediments in the East Asian continental margin that distributes in the eastern part of the Shimonoseki, Yamaguchi Prefecture, southwest Japan. The distribution of the Toyora Group extends north and south, and has been separated between north and south districts by the Tabe Basin and the Kikugawa Fault that is an active left-lateral strike-slip fault.

Geology 
The group rests unconformably on the tilted Paleozoic Renge Metamorphic Rocks and Toyohigashi Group, formations assigned to the Akiyoshi Belt. The Toyora Group is separated by a parallel or locally angular unconformity with the Latest Jurassic to Early Cretaceous Toyonishi Group.

The Toyora Group sediments are composed mainly of black mudstone, sandy mudstone, sandstone, conglomerate that deposited in a shallow marine embayment. The mudstone and very fine-grained sandstone beds are often bioturbated by an ichnogenus Phycosiphon.

See also 
 Toarcian turnover
 Toarcian formations
 Fernie Formation, Alberta and British Columbia
 Whiteaves Formation, British Columbia
 Navajo Sandstone, Utah
 Whitby Mudstone, England
 Posidonia Shale, Lagerstätte in Germany
 Ciechocinek Formation, Germany and Poland
 Lava Formation, Lithuania
 Marne di Monte Serrone, Italy
 Calcare di Sogno
 Toundoute Continental Series, North Africa
 Los Molles Formation, Argentina
 Mawson Formation, Antarctica
 Kandreho Formation, Madagascar
 Kota Formation, India
 Cattamarra Coal Measures, Australia

References 

Geologic groups of Asia
Geologic formations of Japan
Jurassic System of Asia
Hettangian Stage
Sinemurian Stage
Pliensbachian Stage
Toarcian Stage
Aalenian Stage
Callovian Stage
Bathonian Stage
Bajocian Stage
Oxfordian Stage
Kimmeridgian Stage
Tithonian Stage
Mudstone formations
Sandstone formations
Shallow marine deposits
Groups